The Lewiston Public Library, located in Lewiston, New York, in the United States, is a public library originally started in 1900. The library was permanently chartered by the State of New York in 2008. The library is chartered to serve the Town and Village of Lewiston and has a service population of over 14,000. It is part of the Nioga Library System, a non-profit cooperative library system serving the public libraries in three counties. The library system takes its name from the counties that it serves - Niagara, Orleans and Genesee.

History

In July 1901, the newly organized Men's Club of Lewiston proposed “as soon as practicable to establish public reading rooms and to take steps towards forming the nucleus of a public library.”

According to its newsletter, the club “cordially invites all friends of education and progress to attend and bring with them each a book as a contribution to the cause.”

In 1938, the library was almost forced to close its doors for lack of financial support. However, the Lewiston Service Guild stepped in and took over the annual membership drive, collecting $150, which saved the library. The Guild also made building repairs, cleaned and painted the facility and purchased new books. The Guild continued to collect door-to-door for operating funds for many decades.

In 1961, the library moved into the Hotchkiss Building (also known as the “Long House”) at 505 Center Street. The house was built by Judge William Hotchkiss in 1815 after his return home from the War of 1812.

The library received its provisional charter in 1976 and subsequently began to earn support through tax dollars.

In 1990, the library moved into its new building at 305 South Eighth Street in the Village of Lewiston. The late State Senator John B. Daly became the library's main supporter in the late 1980s and 1990s. The new children's wing, added in 1999, is named in his honor.

Art
The Library Board hired sculptor E. B. Cox of Ontario to do renditions of the seven animals representing the seven Tuscarora clans to decorate the new library.

The library is home to the “Bjarne Klaussen Collection”, which depicts buildings of Lewiston, New York that were considered historically significant in the village's development.

Local artist Ellen Comerford has recently donated several of her abstract paintings for display in the library's public Internet computer area. Local artist Jody Ziehm has completed murals for display in the Children's Room.

Services

The Lewiston Public Library is a member of the Nioga Library System.

Directors of the Lewiston Public Library

 Mary Margaret Wright 1901-1908
 Grace C. Farnham 1908-1909
 Eugenia C. Murphy 1910-1912
 Mary A. Murphy 1912-1913
 Alicia M. Ottley 1913-1921
 May A. Murphy 1922-1951
 Mary K. Jones 1952-1954
 Julia Reichert 1955-1961
 Alona J. Smith 1963-1968
 Mary Virginia Scopione 1969-1976
 Gael Stein 1976-1977
 Janet M. Domzella 1977-2000
 Lisa A. Seivert 2000-2006
 Ronald W. Shaw 2006-2010
 Jill Palermo 2010–Present

References

External links
 Library website
  Historic Lewiston, NY webpage
 Genealogy Department webpage
 Nioga Library System
 Downloadable summary of the Morgan Affair form Historic Lewiston

Public libraries in New York (state)